The 1934 All-Ireland Minor Hurling Championship was the seventh staging of the All-Ireland Minor Hurling Championship since its establishment by the Gaelic Athletic Association in 1928.

Tipperary entered the championship as the defending champions.

On 2 September 1934 Tipperary won the championship following a 4-3 to 3-5 defeat of Laois in the All-Ireland final. This was their third All-Ireland title in-a-row and their fourth overall.

Results

All-Ireland Minor Hurling Championship

Semi-finals

Final

Championship statistics

Miscellaneous

 The All-Ireland semi-final between Laois and Down remains their only championship meeting.
 Tipperary became the first team to win three successive All-Ireland Championship titles.

External links
 All-Ireland Minor Hurling Championship: Roll Of Honour

Minor
All-Ireland Minor Hurling Championship